The Schneestock is a mountain of the Urner Alps, located on the border between the Swiss cantons of Valais and Uri. It lies north of the Dammastock, between the Rhone Glacier and the Damma Glacier.

References

External links
 Schneestock on Hikr

Mountains of the Alps
Alpine three-thousanders
Mountains of Switzerland
Mountains of Valais
Mountains of the canton of Uri
Uri–Valais border